Bowman Field may refer to:

Airports
 Bowman Field (Kentucky), an airport in Louisville, Kentucky
 Bowman Field (Maine), an airport in Livermore Falls, Maine
 Bowman Field (Montana), an airport in Anaconda, Montana
 Bowman Municipal Airport, an airport in Bowman, North Dakota

Other uses
 Muncy Bank Ballpark at Historic Bowman Field, a baseball stadium in Williamsport, Pennsylvania
 Bowman Field, a former parade ground in the Clemson University Historic District I at Clemson University